Giuseppe Giunta (born 12 January 1973) is an Italian wrestler. He competed at the 1996 Summer Olympics and the 2000 Summer Olympics.

References

External links
 

1973 births
Living people
Italian male sport wrestlers
Olympic wrestlers of Italy
Wrestlers at the 1996 Summer Olympics
Wrestlers at the 2000 Summer Olympics
Sportspeople from Catania
20th-century Italian people
21st-century Italian people